Oglianico is a comune (municipality) in the Metropolitan City of Turin in the Italian region Piedmont, located about  north of Turin.  
Oglianico borders the following municipalities: Salassa, Rivarolo Canavese, San Ponso, Busano, Favria, Rivarossa, and Front.

References

Cities and towns in Piedmont